The wildlife of Iraq includes its flora and fauna and their natural habitats. Iraq has multiple biomes which include the mountainous region in north to the wet marshlands along the Euphrates river. The western part of the country comprises mainly desert and some semi-arid regions. As of 2001, seven of Iraq's mammal species and 12 of its bird species are endangered. The endangered species include the northern bald ibis and Persian fallow deer. The Syrian wild ass is extinct, and the Saudi Arabian dorcas gazelle was declared extinct in 2008.

Mesopotamian marshes

The marshes are home to 40 species of birds, and several species of fish, plus demarcating a range limit for a number of bird species. The marshes were once home to millions of birds and the stopover for millions of migratory birds, including flamingo, pelican and heron as they migrated from Siberia to Africa. At risk are 40% to 60% of the world's marbled teal population that live in the marshes, along with 90% of the world's population of Basra reed-warbler. Seven species are now extinct or near extinction from the marshes, including the Indian crested porcupine, the bandicoot rat and the marsh gray wolf. The draining of the marshes caused a significant decline in bioproductivity; following the Multi-National Force overthrow of the Saddam Hussein regime, water flow to the marshes was restored and the ecosystem has begun to recover.

Aquatic or semi-aquatic wildlife occurs in and around these lakes:
Lake Habbaniyah
Lake Milh
Lake Qadisiyah
Lake Tharthar

Water birds recorded in marshlands in southern Iraq include little grebe, great crested grebe, cormorant, darter, bittern, grey heron, night heron, purple heron, white stork, cattle egret, sacred ibis, eurasian teal, common redshank, pied kingfisher, greater spotted eagle, marsh harrier, hooded crow, Iraq babbler, crested lark, pin-tailed sandgrouse, collared dove, Indian roller and starling.

Coral reef
Iraqi coastal waters boast a living coral reef, covering an area of 28 km2 in the Persian Gulf, at the mouth of the Shatt al-Arab river. The coral reef was discovered by joint Iraqi–German expeditions of scientific scuba divers carried out in September 2012 and in May 2013. Prior to its discovery, it was believed that Iraq lacks coral reefs as the local turbid waters prevented the detection of the potential presence of local coral reefs. Iraqi corals were found to be adapted to one of the most extreme coral-bearing environments in the world, as the seawater temperature in this area ranges between 14 and 34 °C. The reef harbours several living stone corals, octocorals, ophiuroids and bivalves. There are also silica-containing demosponges.

Fauna

In the 20th century, both Eurasian otter and the smooth-coated otter were present in the marshes, but populations have declined since the 1970s.

A small Persian leopard population was recorded for the first time at the beginning of the 21st century in the border region between Iraq and Turkey. At least nine individuals were killed by local people in this region between 2001 and 2014.

In 2012, the sand cat was recorded for the first time in the desert of Al-Najaf.

Wild mammal species reported having been present in the 20th century include:
Wild boar
Bactrian camel
Fallow deer
Roe deer
Goitered gazelle
Wild goat
European hare
Indian crested porcupine
Caucasian squirrel
Broad-toothed field mouse
Yellow-necked mouse
House mouse
Black rat
Short-tailed bandicoot rat
Indian gerbil
Sundevall's jird

Extinct fauna
The only confirmed record of a Caspian tiger was a specimen killed near Mosul in 1887.
The Asiatic cheetah used to occur in the desert west of Basrah until 1926. The last known cheetah in the country was killed by a car.
The last known Asiatic lion was killed on the lower Tigris in 1918.
The last Arabian oryx was shot in 1914.

See also
List of mammals of Iraq
Wildlife of Iran

References

External links
 "Online Photo Galleries" on Nature and Wildlife of India at "India Nature Watch (INW)" - spreading the love of nature and wildlife in India through photography
 Iraq's Unique Wildlife Pushed to Brink by War, Hunting
 A lion in Iraq

Iraq